Thạch Bảo Khanh (born April 25, 1979) is the retired Vietnamese footballer. He is a member of Vietnam national football team since 2002.  he is the current manager V.League 1 club Viettel. He is best known for his performance at 2004 Tiger Cup even though Vietnam was relegated from the group-stage.

International goal

References

External links

Vietnamese footballers
Association football midfielders
1979 births
Living people
Footballers at the 2002 Asian Games
Footballers at the 2006 Asian Games
Sportspeople from Hanoi
Viettel FC players
Asian Games competitors for Vietnam
Vietnam international footballers
21st-century Vietnamese people